Rok is a masculine given name, mainly used in Slovenia, cognate to Italian Rocco and Croatian Roko.

Notable people with the name include:

Rok Baskera (born 1993), Slovenian footballer
Rok Benkovič (born 1986), Slovenian ski jumper
Rok Božič (born 1985), Slovenian footballer
Rok Drakšič (born 1987), Slovenian judoka
Rok Elsner (born 1986), Slovenian footballer
Rok Flander (born 1979), Slovenian snowboarder
Rok Golčar (born 1985), Slovenian handball player
Rok Golob, Slovenian composer
Rok Hanžič (born 1981), Slovenian footballer
Rok Kolander (born 1980), Slovenian rower
Rok Kopitar (born 1959), Slovenian hurdler
Rok Kronaveter (born 1986), Slovenian footballer
Rok Marguč (born 1986), Slovenian snowboarder
Rok Mordej (born 1989), Slovenian futsal player
Rok Pajič (born 1985), Slovenian ice hockey player
Rok Perko (born 1985), Slovenian alpine skier
Rok Petrovič (1966–1993), Slovenian alpine skier
Rok Roj (born 1986), Slovenian footballer
Rok Rozman (born 1988), Slovenian rower
Rok Stipčević (born 1986), Croatian basketball player
Rok Štraus (born 1987), Slovenian footballer
Rok Tičar (born 1989), Slovenian ice hockey player
Rok Urbanc (born 1985), Slovenian ski jumper

Masculine given names
Slovene masculine given names